Ilaria Galbusera (born 3 February 1991) is an Italian deaf female model, beauty pageant contestant and volleyball player. She has represented Italy at the Deaflympics in 2009, 2013 and 2017 as a volleyball player. Ilaria won the 2011 Miss Deaf World global beauty contest which was held in Prague. Ilaria Galbusera was also the part of the Italian women's volleyball team which claimed silver medal during the 2017 Summer Deaflympics.

Miss Deaf World 2011
Ilaria Galbusera competed as one of the 38 finalists in the 11th edition of Miss Deaf World contest in 2011, held in Congress Hall Top Hotel, Prague, Czech Republic. She was crowned as the Miss Deaf World 2011 at the age of 20 while Elena Korchagina emerged as 1st runners-up and Dian Inggrawati emerged as 2nd runners-up. She also crowned as the Miss Deaf Sympathy 2011.

References

External links
 

1991 births
Deaf beauty pageant contestants
Italian deaf people
Deaf volleyball players
Italian beauty pageant winners
Italian female models
Italian women's volleyball players
Living people
Place of birth missing (living people)